Agila ng Maynila is a 1988 Filipino action film directed by Pablo Santiago, written by Pablo S. Gomez, and produced by Fernando Poe Jr., who stars as Mauro Reyes, the titular "eagle" of Manila. The film also stars Vic Vargas, Paquito Diaz, Charlie Davao, Raoul Aragon, Vic Diaz, Dencio Padilla, Lito Anzures, Mario Escudero, and Lucita Soriano. Produced by FPJ Productions, Agila ng Maynila was released on December 25, 1988, as part of the 14th Metro Manila Film Festival (MMFF). Agila ng Maynila was the highest-grossing film among the six entries of the festival, and R.R. Herrera won the MMFF Award for Best Child Performer.

Cast
Fernando Poe Jr. as Mauro Reyes
Vic Vargas
Paquito Diaz as Castro
Charlie Davao
Raoul Aragon
Vic Diaz
Dencio Padilla
Lito Anzures
Mario Escudero
Lucita Soriano
Nello Nayo
Max Alvarado as Badong Busangol
Encar Benedicto
R.R. Herrera

Release
Agila ng Maynila was given a "P-15" rating by the Movie and Television Review and Classification Board (MTRCB), and was released on December 25, 1988, as part of the 14th Metro Manila Film Festival (MMFF).

Box office
On its opening day, Agila ng Maynila grossed ₱2.570 million, ahead of other MMFF films. By January, the film would retain its standing as the highest-grossing film among the six entries of the 14th MMFF. Poe's enduring popularity among the Filipino people is cited as the main reason for the film's success.

Critical response
Lav Diaz, writing for the Manila Standard, grouped Agila ng Maynila with Celestina Sanchez, Alyas Bubbles – Enforcer: Ativan Gang and Patrolman as films which directly placed the "dark face of the police establishment" on public trial. Though Diaz did not give an assessment of the film's quality, he described it as possessing a positive outlook, with the main character having the perspective that society needs only a hero to fix its problems and the police.

Home media
Agila ng Maynila was released on DVD by Viva Video in 2006. The next year, Viva Video would pair the film for its "Da King" collector's edition DVD with Ang Anino ni Asedillo, a film starring Poe's half-brother Conrad Poe and featuring an appearance by Poe himself.

Accolades

References

External links

1988 films
1988 action films
Filipino-language films
Films directed by Pablo Santiago
Films set in Manila
Films with screenplays by Pablo S. Gomez
Philippine action films